Mediavia emerantia is a species of snout moth in the genus Mediavia. It was described by Schaus in 1922. It is found in Peru.

References

Moths described in 1922
Epipaschiinae